The National States' Rights Party was a white supremacist political party that briefly played a minor role in the politics of the United States.

Foundation
Founded in 1958 in Knoxville, Tennessee, by Edward Reed Fields, a 26-year-old chiropractor and supporter of J. B. Stoner, the party was based on antisemitism, racism and opposition to racial integration with African Americans. Party officials argued for states' rights against the advance of the civil rights movement, and the organization itself established relations with the Ku Klux Klan and Minutemen. Although a white supremacist movement, its messaging was never openly neo-Nazi in the way that its successors in the American Nazi Party were.

The national chairman of the party was Stoner, who served three years in prison for bombing the Bethel Baptist Church in Birmingham, Alabama. The party produced a newspaper, Thunderbolt, which was edited by Fields. In 1958, the party's first year, five men with links to the NSRP were indicted for their participation in the Hebrew Benevolent Congregation Temple bombing in Atlanta.

On December 27, 1963 Edward Fields was brought to the US Secret Service's attention as a possible threat against protected individuals. This was divulged as part of the JFK file release. The FBI considered that Fields was "one step removed from being insane."

Development
During the 1960 presidential election, at a secret meeting held in a rural lodge near Dayton, Ohio, the NSRP nominated Governor of Arkansas Orval E. Faubus for President and retired U.S. Navy Rear Admiral John G. Crommelin of Alabama for Vice President. Faubus, however, did not campaign on this ticket actively, and won only 0.07% of the vote (best in his native Arkansas: 6.76%). The party also ran in the 1964 presidential election, nominating John Kasper for President and J. B. Stoner for Vice President, although they won only 0.01%, i.e., less than 7,000 votes.

The party began to expand its operations and moved to new headquarters in Birmingham in 1960. Supporters were soon kitted out in the party uniform of white shirts, black pants and ties and armbands bearing the Thunderbolt version of the Wolfsangel. Thunderbolt itself gained a circulation of 15,000 in the late 1960s and the party became active in rallies across the United States, with events in Baltimore, Maryland, in 1966 being particularly notorious because five leading members were imprisoned for inciting riots. The Federal Bureau of Investigation targeted the NSRP under its COINTELPRO-WHITE HATE program.

The party attempted to gain international contacts, and during the 1970s took part in annual international neo-Nazi rallies at Diksmuide in Belgium, alongside such groups as the Order of Flemish militants and the United Kingdom–based League of Saint George. Before that, the party had been close to the British extremist leader John Tyndall and his Greater Britain Movement after Tyndall failed in his attempts to forge links with George Lincoln Rockwell.

Violence
Five men with connections to the Party perpetrated the 1958  Hebrew Benevolent Congregation Temple bombing in Atlanta, Georgia.

Presidential tickets

Decline
The party's influence declined in the 1970s, as Fields began to devote more of his energies to the Ku Klux Klan. As a result, in April 1976, U.S. Attorney General Edward H. Levi concluded an FBI investigation into the group after it was decided that they posed no threat.

The NSRP began its terminal decline when Stoner was convicted for a bombing in 1980. Without his leadership, the party descended into factionalism, and in August 1983, Fields was expelled for spending too much time in the Klan. Without its two central figures, the NSRP fell apart, and by 1987, it had ceased to exist.

Similar groups
The group had no specific connection to the less extreme, southern conservative States' Rights Democratic Party, although it did share some of its views. Similarly, the party had no direct connection to the group of the same name set up in June 2005 in Philadelphia, Mississippi, after the conviction of Edgar Ray Killen for his role in three 1964 murders (although this group consciously picked the name to evoke Stoner's defunct movement).

References

External links 
FBI monograph on the National States Rights Party
Picture of John Kaspar of the National States Rights Party speaking in front of the party's lightning bolt flag (the flag was red, white, and blue):
"Documented Proof: Jews Behind Race-Mixing" by Edward R. Fields (hosted at the Internet Archive)

Chicago office files Part 1
Chicago office files Part 1A
Chicago office files Part 2
Chicago office files Part 2A
Chicago office files Part 3
Chicago office files Part 3A
Chicago office files Part 4
Chicago office files Part 4A
Chicago office files Part 5
Chicago office files Part 5-1
Chicago office files Part 5-2
Chicago office files Part 6
Chicago office files Part 6A
Chicago office files Part 7
Chicago office files Part 8
Chicago office files Part 9
Chicago office files Part 10
Chicago office files Part 11
Chicago office files Part 12
Chicago office files Part 13
Chicago office files Part 14
Chicago office files Part 15
Chicago office files Part 16
Chicago office files Part 17
Chicago office files Part 18-19
NYC office files Part 1
NYC office files Part 2
NYC office files Part 3
NYC office files Part 4
NYC office files Part 5
NYC office files Part 6
NYC office files Part 7
NYC office files Part 8
NYC office files Part 9
NYC office files Part 10
NYC office files Part 11

COINTELPRO targets
Political parties established in 1958
Defunct far-right political parties in the United States
Defunct political parties in the United States
Political repression in the United States
White nationalist parties
1958 establishments in Tennessee
Political parties in the United States
Neo-Confederate organizations